Kenneth Arthur Middleditch (5 October 1925 – 9 January 2021) was a British motorcycle speedway rider.

Career
Middleditch served in the RAF in World War II as a rear gunner, and became interested in speedway while stationed in Egypt. 

Middleditch signed for Third Division team Hastings in 1948 after progressing through Eastbourne's speedway training school. By 1949 he had become Hastings top points scorer but at the end of that year Hastings were forced to close down and he signed for Poole. 

Middleditch had a successful career at Poole, forming an effective pairing with Poole rider Tony Lewis, he eventually became the team captain and won four league titles with the club. Middleditch left Poole for the 1957 season when the club closed for a year and signed for Swindon. He returned to Poole for a further two stints before retiring in 1962. 

Middleditch's son, Neil, also had a successful career as a speedway rider and has been team manager of the Poole Pirates since 1998.

After retiring from the sport Middleditch set up a business, Middleditch Salvage, in Sturminster Marshall, Dorset. He died in January 2021 at the age of 95.

References 

1925 births
2021 deaths
British speedway riders
English motorcycle racers
People from Camberley
Poole Pirates riders
Swindon Robins riders
Royal Air Force personnel of World War II
Royal Air Force airmen